Nina Tyurkina (born 4 August 1931) is a Soviet athlete. She competed in the women's long jump at the 1952 Summer Olympics.

References

External links
 

1931 births
Possibly living people
Athletes (track and field) at the 1952 Summer Olympics
Soviet female long jumpers
Olympic athletes of the Soviet Union
Place of birth missing (living people)